Luzius Wildhaber (18 January 1937, Basel, Switzerland – 22 July 2020) was a Swiss judge. He was the first president of the European Court of Human Rights in its new format after the ratification of Protocol 11, which opened up direct access for citizens from the 47 member states of the Council of Europe.

Education 
He studied law at the University of Basel, and Yale where he obtained a Master of Laws in 1965 and Doctor in Juridical Science in 1968.

Professional career 
He became a professor of law at the University of Fribourg in 1971. He was a judge in Liechtenstein between 1975 and 1988 and a lecturer on international law and constitutional law at the University of Basel between 1977 and 1998. At the university he served as professor, dean and rector at different times. He was elected a judge of the European Court of Human rights in 1991 and served as its president between 1 November 1998 to 18 January 2007. One of the cases over which presided was the appeal of Abdullah Öcalan. He died on 22 July 2020.

Awards and recognition 

 1999 Marcel Benoist Prize
 2004 Honorary Doctorate of the University of Neuchâtel
 2009

References 

Presidents of the European Court of Human Rights
People from Basel-Stadt
1937 births
2020 deaths
20th-century Swiss judges
21st-century Swiss judges
Swiss judges of international courts and tribunals